Roderfield is a census-designated place (CDP) in McDowell County, West Virginia, United States. Roderfield has a post office with ZIP code 24881. As of the 2010 census, its population is 188.

The community was named after Roderfield Iager, the original owner of the town site.

References

Census-designated places in McDowell County, West Virginia
Census-designated places in West Virginia
Coal towns in West Virginia